The 1992 CECAFA Cup was the 19th edition of the tournament. It was held in Tanzania, and was won by Uganda. The matches were played between November 15–28.

Tanzania sent two teams: Tanzania A and Tanzania B.

Group stage

Group A
Played in Arusha

Group B
Played in Mwanza

Knockout stage

Semi-finals

Third place match

Final

References
 RSSSF archives
 Wildstat

CECAFA Cup
1992
CEC
1992 in Tanzanian sport